The II Marine Expeditionary Force (II MEF) is a Marine Air-Ground Task Force consisting of ground, air and logistics forces capable of projecting offensive combat power ashore while sustaining itself in combat without external assistance for a period of 60 days. The II Marine Expeditionary Force is commanded by a lieutenant general, who serves under U.S. Marine Corps Forces Command, providing Marine fighting formations and units to European Command, Central Command and Southern Command. The current Commanding General is Lieutenant General David A. Ottignon. The Deputy Commanding General is Brigadier General Andrew T. Priddy.

Higher headquarters

II MEF falls under the command of U.S. Marine Corps Forces Command (MARFORCOM), and is a service retained force, meaning it is not assigned or allocated to any of the Geographic Combatant Commands. However, II MEF regularly provides subordinate units in support of operations and exercises throughout the U.S. European Command, U.S. Africa Command, and U.S. Southern Command Areas of Responsibility, as well as in support of other U.S. unified and NATO commands. II MEF units are available for and prepared to respond to contingency requirements worldwide.

Employment

In addition to the option of being employed in its entirety as a MEF-sized unit, II MEF has the capability of forming task-organized Marine Air-Ground Task Forces (MAGTF) of lesser size such as a MEF (Forward), a brigade-sized MAGTF (Marine Expeditionary Brigade or "MEB") about one-third the size of a MEF or a Marine Expeditionary Unit (MEU), about one-third the size of a MEB. The size and composition of any MAGTF will be dependent upon the mission assigned. One mission that could be assigned to the MEB would be assignment for planning, deployment and utilization of equipment stored aboard Maritime Prepositioning Ships (MPS). The MPS program involves the forward deployment of the MPS Squadron of four or five ships loaded with a brigade's worth of combat equipment and supplies and the airlifting of the MEB to the designated objective area to link up with the MPS Squadron. At the same time, tactical aircraft of the MEB are flight ferried to an airfield in or near the area of operation. The MEB can be sustained for 30 days by the supplies aboard the ships.

The only routinely deployed MAGTFs, the 22d, 24th and 26th MEUs deploy on a rotating basis to the Mediterranean Sea area to serve as the landing force for the Commander, 6th Fleet. The MEU consists of approximately 2,200 Marines and Sailors, is capable of rapid response in a variety of possible contingencies, and if the situation requires, can serve as the forward element of a larger MAGTF.

Structure

Units

 II Marine Expeditionary Force Information Group: Command element
 II MEF Support Battalion
 2nd Intelligence Battalion
2nd Radio Battalion
8th Communications Battalion
2nd Air Naval Gunfire Liaison Company (ANGLICO)
 2nd Marine Division: Ground combat element
 2nd Marine Aircraft Wing: Aviation combat element
 2nd Marine Logistics Group: Logistics combat element
 2nd Marine Expeditionary Brigade
 22nd Marine Expeditionary Unit
 24th Marine Expeditionary Unit
 26th Marine Expeditionary Unit

List of commanders

See also
Julian C. Smith Hall

References

 Globalsecurity.org

External links
 II MEF's official website

Corps of the United States Marine Corps